Abraham Wood (1610–1682), sometimes referred to as "General" or "Colonel" Wood, was an English fur trader, militia officer, politician and explorer of 17th century colonial Virginia. Wood helped build and maintained Fort Henry at the falls of the Appomattox in present-day Petersburg. He also served in the Virginia House of Burgesses, and as a member of the Virginia Governor's Council.

Early and family life
Abraham Wood emigrated from England as a 10-year-old boy in 1620. The English ship "Margaret and John", on which he sailed as an indentured servant or cabin boy was attacked by two Spanish vessels in the West Indies; Wood was one of the few survivors; the attack led the vessel to turn to the Virginia colonies.

Career

By 1625, Wood worked for Captain Samuel Mathews and lived at Jamestown. He also filed land claims for areas on the lower Appomattox River in the 1630s, and in 1638. by which time he had turned to exploring the colony's interior, and traded for the beaver and deerskin with the native tribes. Upon being expelled from their villages at Bermuda Hundred and Swift Creek, natives had established a village near the falls of the Appomattox River, which would much later would become part of Petersburg. Natives revolted in 1644.

Virginia colonists responded in part by building Fort Henry in 1646 at the falls of the Appomatox River. It supposedly marked the legal frontier between the white settlers and the Native Americans, as well as defended both the settler on the south side of the James River (about 20 miles north of the Appomattox River) and the native Appomattoc tribe which had grain fields and fished in the Appomattox River near the falls, and with whom Abraham Wood traded. From 1646 until around 1691, it became the only point in Virginia where Native Americans could legally cross eastward into white territory, or whites westward into Native American territory. Soon after its construction, Abraham Wood commanded a garrison of 3 soldiers from Henrico County, 12 from Charles City County and 15 each from James City County and Isle of Wight County. Not long after, other colonists thought the tax burden too great, so the government allowed the fort and 600 acres of land sold to Wood, who agreed to keep 10 armed men at the fort for three years. Thus Wood, who both commanded the fort and privately owned the adjoining land and trading post, a considerable advantage over his competitors in the "Indian trade".

Abraham Wood represented Henrico County in the House of Burgesses from 1644 to 1646, then Charles City County from 1652 and 1656.  He was a justice of Charles City County in 1655. Also in 1655, he was appointed to a committee to review Virginia's laws. He was elected to the Virginia Governor's Council on March 13, 1657–68 and actively served until at least 1671, and according to correspondence, kept his seat through at least 1676, probably 1680.

Wood dispatched several exploration parties from Fort Henry during these years, including one that he personally led in 1650, which explored the upper reaches of the James River and Roanoke River. In August 1650, Abraham Wood and Edward Bland reached and traveled on the Great Indian Warpath, penetrating the Carolina region southwest of the Roanoke River and discovering westward flowing rivers. Daniel Coxe mentions that "Parts of this Country were discovered by the English long before the French had the least knowledge... Colonel Wood of Virginia... from the years 1654 to 1664 discovered at several times several branches of the great rivers Ohio and Mesechaceba."

Wood also dispatched the first English expeditions to reach the southern Appalachian Mountains. In 1671, explorers Thomas Wood, Thomas Batts (Batte) and Robert Fallam reached the New River Valley and the New River. "Batts was a grandson of Robert Batts, vicar master of University College, Oxford, and possible relation to Nathaniel Batts, first permanent settler in North Carolina and Governor of Roanoke Island. Nathaniel by 1655 had a busy Indian trade from his home on Albemarle Sound. Thomas Wood may have been Abraham's son. Robert Fallam is a question mark. The journal he kept of their experience shows him to be a literate, educated man." The New River was named Wood's River after Abraham Wood, although in time it became better known as the New River. Batts and Fallam are generally credited with being the first Europeans to enter within the present-day borders of West Virginia.

In 1673 Wood sent his friend James Needham and his indentured servant Gabriel Arthur on an expedition to find an outlet to the Pacific Ocean. Shortly after their departure Needham and Arthur encountered a group of Tomahitan Native Americans, who offered to conduct the men to their town across the mountains . After reaching the Tomahitan town Needham returned to Fort Henry to report to Wood. While en route back to the Tomahitan town Needham was killed by a member of the trading party with whom he was traveling . Shortly thereafter, Arthur was almost killed by a mob in the Tomahitan settlement, but was saved and then adopted by the town's headman.  Arthur lived with the Tomahitans for almost a year, accompanying them on war and trading expeditions as far south as Spanish Florida  and as far north as the Ohio River .

Wood was appointed colonel of a militia regiment in Henrico and Charles City counties in 1655. Later, he was appointed major general but lost this position in 1676 after Bacon's Rebellion either because of infirmity or political differences with Governor William Berkeley. Bacon's rebel forces attacked the Appomattoc Indians on both sides of the river, killed many and dispersed the rest, after burning their town.

By 1670 Wood had relinquished his trading post to his son-in-law, Peter Jones, for whom Petersburg, Virginia would eventually be named, and in 1675 Jones became commander of the reactivated fort. Jones had married Wood's daughter Margaret, and a map drafted in 1670 named what had been "Fort Henry" on earlier maps, simply "Wood". In 1676, Governor Berkeley wrote that Maj. Gen. Wood of the council kept to his house through infirmity. By March 1678–79, he was strong enough to negotiate with the Native Americans and to arrange for the chief men of hostile tribes to meet in Jamestown.

Wood retired to patent more plantation land in 1680 west of the fort, in what had been Appomattoc territory, notwithstanding it being disallowed by the House of Burgesses.

Death and legacy
Abraham Wood died some time between 1681 and 1686, possibly in 1682. Further westward explorations stalled until undertaken by Governor Spottswood.

Notes

References

 Tyler, Lyon Gardiner, ed. Encyclopedia of Virginia Biography. Volume 1. New York, Lewis Historical Publishing Company, 1915. . Retrieved February 16, 2013.
 

1610 births
1682 deaths
American fur traders
House of Burgesses members
Virginia colonial people
Virginia Governor's Council members